KPDQ may refer to:

 KPDQ-FM, a radio station (93.9 FM) licensed to Portland, Oregon, United States
 KPDQ (AM), a radio station (800 AM) licensed to Portland, Oregon, United States